The Purbakala Archaeological Museum is a museum located in Bedulu on Bali, Indonesia.

Literature

External links 
 Gedong Arca Museum
 Planetware | Gedong Arca Purbakala

Museums in Bali
Archaeological museums in Indonesia